Floyd W. Jones Lebanon Airport  is a city-owned public-use airport located three nautical miles (6 km) south of the central business district of Lebanon, a city in Laclede County, Missouri, United States. This airport is included in the National Plan of Integrated Airport Systems for 2011–2015, which categorized it as a general aviation airport.

Although most U.S. airports use the same three-letter location identifier for the FAA and IATA, this airport is assigned LBO by the FAA, but has no designation from the IATA (which assigned LBO to Lusambo Airport in the Democratic Republic of the Congo).

Facilities and aircraft 
Floyd W. Jones Lebanon Airport covers an area of 277 acres (112 ha) at an elevation of 1,321 feet (403 m) above mean sea level. It has one runway designated 18/36 with an asphalt surface measuring 5,000 by 75 feet (1,524 x 23 m).

For the 12-month period ending August 31, 2010, the airport had 12,725 aircraft operations, an average of 34 per day:
94% general aviation, 5% air taxi, and 1% military. At that time there were 33 aircraft based at this airport: 76% single-engine, 9% multi-engine, and 15% jet.

References

External links 
 Aerial image as of April 1995 from USGS The National Map
 

Airports in Missouri
Buildings and structures in Laclede County, Missouri